The Namibian Special Forces is a special operations command of the Namibian Defence Force responsible for special forces and special operations capable units. The command consists of Army commandos, Army Airborne paratroopers and the Marine Corps amphibious special operations unit. The Army commandos specialize in airborne and land borne insertion while the Marine Corps amphibious special operations unit specialize in small-unit maritime operations that originate from a river, ocean, swamp and delta. The army units receive training assistance from former South African Special Forces (Recces) and the marine corps from the Brazilian Marine Corps. The units regularly participate in Southern African Development Community (SADC) special forces exercises.

Role
The roles vary according to the unit. The Airborne Parachute Battalion role is to be dropped to an objective via static line parachuting. The Pathfinder unit is a Special Reconnaissance unit of the Parachute Battalion, its role is to deploy small units to search a potential land zone and set it up before the larger parachute unit is dropped there making them the eyes and ears of the parachute unit. The Commando Unit is the principal Special Operations and Counter-insurgency unit whose primary role is Special reconnaissance by inserting using unconventional parachute techniques to achieve an objective. The Amphibious Special Operations Unit is also Special Operations whose main role Amphibious Warfare is to provide recon support before a larger Marine Unit is deployed. 
The Special operations roles include but not limited to:
Special reconnaissance
Direct action (military)
High-value target
Human intelligence (intelligence gathering)
High-altitude military parachuting
Counter-terrorism
Quick reaction force
Combat search and rescue
Covert operations
Counter-insurgency

Units

Airborne 
A Parachute Unit Consisting of at least 3 rifle Companies, support company, a Pathfinder Sub-unit and Headquarters element.

Commando 
A Commando Regiment is gradually expanding its capability to include a Maritime Capability.

Amphibious Commandos 
The Amphibious Commandos Unit (part of the Marine Corps Infantry Battalion) is based at Walvis Bay with the Navy.

Training

Paratroopers 
Pre-Selection phase is 6 weeks long during which candidates are tested on military skills, such as Musketry Training, Navigation, Field Craft. After going through the pre selection phase the candidates progress to the Parachute Selection Phase. Both phases are physically and mentally tough. The pass rate for both phases is only 30 percent. The candidates then progress to the Basic Static Line Jump Course which consists of a 1-week ground phase and 3 weeks of Practical Parachute Jumping. Included in this is 9 Parachute Jumps which of which 5 are Clean Fatigue jumps with Combat Webbing and Weapon jump, a Personal Weapons Container (PWC) jump and a Night jump. After completing this the candidate is officially a paratrooper and is awarded the Parachute jump wings and the maroon beret. Training takes place at the Namibia Special Forces School at the Grootfontein Air Base.

The training cycle continues for paratroopers and undergo further courses depending on their roles and ranks. Paratrooper Officers in the course of their careers undertake courses like the Airborne Battle Handling course and the Paratrooper Company Commanders And Second-In-Command Courses. Senior Non Commissioned officer's undertake courses like the Paratrooper Company Warrant Officer's/Quartermasters Course which includes aspects like how to build a field base and Battlefield replenishment are taught.

Pathfinders 
Pathfinders are taken from existing Paratroopers. A Pathfinder student should be Basic Static Line Parachuting and Basic Free Fall Parachuting qualified. The Pathfinder course is 8 weeks long Pathfinder Selection  covers Bush Craft, Tracking and Survival, Escape and Evasion, Minor Tactics, Basic Photography, Basic Signals, DZSO (Drop Zone Safety Officer), Helicopter and Fixed Wing Landing Zones.

Commandos 
The Commando operators basic course is 9 months long. Training takes place at the Special Forces School in Grootfontein. To qualify for the Commando operators Course the student should already be a qualified paratrooper having completed the Basic Static Line Parachute Jump Course. The Commando operators course covers Pre-Selection and Selection, Bush Craft, Tracking and Survival Escape and Evasion, Minor Tactics, Kayak Handling, Basic Photography, Basic Signals, Basic Urban, Basic Demolitions. Friendly countries including  South Africa and Russia also accept candidates into their basic training  cycles. After passing the operators course the student is then awarded the Special Forces Dagger.

The advanced training cycle then starts for the operator for another 36 months in order to become a fully qualified Commando specialist. The specialist training cycle covers Advanced Signals, Small Boats (Kayaks), Combat Photography, Sharp Shooter, Advanced Demolitions, Advanced Urban, Combat Swimming, Scuba Diving, Attack Diving, Commando Team Leaders, Fast-roping and Rappelling, Basic Mountaineering and Advanced 4x4 Driver Skills.

Amphibious Commandos 
The Amphibious Special Operations Unit are trained in Walvis Bay by Brazilian instructors. The amphibious commando basic training course is 12 months after which the successful marine is then given the Operators badge and an Amphibious Commando patched to wear on their left arm. Only existing Marines are eligible for this training.

Equipment

Known Weapons

Rifles

SubMachine-guns

Machine-guns

Grenades and Grenade Launchers

Anti-Tank Weapons

Sniper rifle

Known Vehicles

Commanders

References

Military of Namibia
Special forces of Namibia